Michael John Whitmarsh (May 18, 1962 – February 17, 2009) was an American male volleyball and basketball player. He won the silver medal in the men's inaugural beach volleyball tournament at the 1996 Summer Olympics, partnering with Mike Dodd. Throughout his volleyball career, Whitmarsh earned over $1.6 million as well as 28 tournament wins.

Whitmarsh played college basketball for the San Diego Toreros. He was a two-time all-conference player in the West Coast Athletic Conference (WCAC), known now as the West Coast Conference, and led San Diego to their first-ever conference title in 1984. He played professional basketball for three years in Europe before turning to volleyball.

Early life
Whitmarsh was born in San Diego. He played basketball at Monte Vista High in Spring Valley, California and later Grossmont College in El Cajon. He did not take academics seriously as a freshman at Grossmont. Whitmarsh did not think that he had a chance to get an athletic scholarship until Toreros coach Jim Brovelli showed interest in him. Lacking the units to be admitted into the University of San Diego (USD), Whitmash committed himself to studying.

College career
The  Whitmarsh played college basketball at USD. He started all 24 games as a junior, averaging 15.3 points and 5.3 rebounds per game and earning all-conference honors in the WCAC. As a senior in 1983–84, he averaged 18.8 points and 7.3 rebounds and led the Toreros to an 18–10 record and the 1984 NCAA tournament. In the final game of the regular season against Saint Mary's, he had 24 points and six rebounds in a 68–59 win to clinch the Torreros' first-ever WCAC title. He was named All-WCAC again, and was runner-up to John Stockton in the voting for the WCAC Player of the Year.

Professional career
Whitmarsh was drafted by the NBA's Portland Trail Blazers in the fifth round in 1984. He also narrowly missed making the roster of the Minnesota Timberwolves, and played professionally in Germany for three years before abandoning basketball in favor of beach volleyball.  Transitioning from the indoor hard court to the soft sand of beach volleyball (which is often played under hot and humid conditions) was not easy, and he developed a reputation for cramping late in tournaments.  His leg cramps were so bad that he often required an I.V. to rehydrate and equalize his chemical balance.

Death
Whitmarsh was in the midst of a divorce from his wife Cindy and was found dead in a friend's garage on Wednesday, February 17, 2009, leaving behind two young daughters. According to the San Diego County medical examiner, he died of suicide from inhalation of carbon monoxide from automobile exhaust.

Awards and honors
 AVP Rookie of the Year 1990
 AVP King of the Beach 2000
 AVP Best Blocker 2002
 AVP Lifetime Achievement 2004
 AVP Role Model Award 2003
 AVP Special Achievement 2003

References

External links
 
 
 College basketball stats at Sports-Reference.com
 Obituary in the Los Angeles Daily News

1962 births
2009 suicides
American men's volleyball players
Alba Berlin players
American men's basketball players
American men's beach volleyball players
Beach volleyball players at the 1996 Summer Olympics
Grossmont College alumni
Medalists at the 1996 Summer Olympics
Olympic beach volleyball players of the United States
Olympic medalists in beach volleyball
Portland Trail Blazers draft picks
San Diego Toreros men's basketball players
Suicides by carbon monoxide poisoning
Suicides in California
Basketball players from San Diego
Volleyball players from San Diego